Northern Light Orchestra is a Christmas-themed supergroup, founded in 2009, and composed of more than 20 artists who are already successful in heavy metal, hard rock bands. The group's music has been compared to Trans-Siberian Orchestra.

It is not to be confused with Northern Lights Orchestra, organized for the album What If Mozart Wrote "White Christmas".

Overview 

Vocalists and musicians in the Northern Light Orchestra include members and former members of bands such as The Beach Boys, Sly and the Family Stone, Alice Cooper, Survivor, Steely Dan, Firehouse, Megadeth, Sister Sledge, Quiet Riot, Vanilla Fudge, Winger, Guns N' Roses, Grand Funk Railroad, Kiss, House of Lords and Whitesnake. The artists who have performed with Northern Light Orchestra have collectively sold over 200 million albums worldwide.

In 2009, the orchestra performed in a one-hour live concert featuring many of the performers from the Spirit of Christmas album. The one-hour Christmas special was aired on broadcast and satellite television including JCTV, Cornerstone TV, Daystar Network, TCT and NRB Network, with potential airings on PBS affiliates as well.

Discography 
 The Spirit of Christmas (2009)
 Celebrate Christmas (2010)
 The Night Before Christmas (2012) 
 Ring Out the Bells EP (2013)
 Star Of The East  (2017)

Members 
The following is a list of artists who contributed to the band:

 Bill Leverty (Firehouse)
 Bob Carlisle (Allies, Billy Thermal)
 Bruce Kulick (Kiss, Grand Funk Railroad, Union)
 Chris Sanders (Lizzy Borden)
 Chuck Wright (Quiet Riot, Giuffria, House of Lords)
 Danny Vaughn (Tyketto, Waysted, Vaughn)
 David Ellefson (Megadeth, F5)
 David Victor (Boston)
 Debbie Sledge (Sister Sledge)
 Dizzy Reed (Guns N' Roses, Johnny Crash)
 Doug Aldrich (Whitesnake, Dio)
 Elliot Randall (Steely Dan)
 George Lynch (Dokken, Lynch Mob)
 Glen Drover (Megadeth, Queensrÿche)
 Jason Hook (Five Finger Death Punch, Alice Cooper)
 Jill Ragee Downing 
 John Davis (Q and Not U, F5)
 John Elefante (Kansas, Petra, Toto)
 Jon Gibson (Stevie Wonder, Michael Jackson)
 Kane Roberts (Alice Cooper)
 Ken Mary (Fifth Angel, Alice Cooper, Impellitteri)
 Kendall Bechtal (Fifth Angel)
 Kip Winger (Alice Cooper, Winger, Alan Parsons, Jordan Rudess)
 Lanny Cordola (House of Lords, The Beach Boys, Magdalen)
 Lita Ford (The Runaways)
 Mark Slaughter (Slaughter, Vinnie Vincent Invasion) 
 Reb Beach (Winger, Night Ranger, Dokken, Whitesnake)
 Robin McAuley (McAuley Schenker Group, Survivor)
 Rose Stone (Sly and the Family Stone), (Elton John Band)
 Shane Gibson (Korn, Jonathan Davis and the SFA)
 Steve Conley (F5)(Flotsam and Jetsam)
 Tim Gaines (Stryper)
 Tony Franklin (The Firm, Paul Rodgers), Jimmy Page)
 Troy Luccketta (Tesla)
 Vinny Appice (Dio, Black Sabbath)
 Vivian Campbell (Sweet Savage, Dio, Whitesnake, Def Leppard)

See also 

 Christmas Music

References

External links 

 Northern Light Orchestra at Spirit of Metal

Christmas music
Supergroups (music)
Musical groups established in 2009